South Pier (originally known as Victoria Pier) is one of three piers in Blackpool, England. Located on South Promenade on the South Shore, the pier contains a number of amusement and adrenaline rides. It opens each year from March to November and is owned by The Sedgwick family.

Construction and opening
The Blackpool South Shore Pier & Pavilion Co. Ltd. was registered in November 1890 and work began to build the pier in 1892. It was constructed, at a total cost of £50,000, using a different method than that used for North and Central piers, the Worthington Screwpile System. It opened, with a choir, two brass bands and an orchestra on Good Friday 1893. The 3,000 capacity Grand Pavilion opened on 20 May. It was built shorter and wider than North and Central piers to accommodate pavilions.

History
Victoria Pier was considered to be more "upmarket" than North and Central piers, and at first provided little entertainment. Holidaymakers started visiting the South Shore in 1896 when a carousel was installed on the sand dunes. In 1902 the south entrance of the promenade was widened with the construction of the present promenade, and the pier entrance had to be moved back. In 1930 the pier was renamed South Pier. In 1938 the entrance was widened, and the Regal Pavilion constructed.

Two fires in six years changed the pier dramatically. First in 1958, a fire damaged the Grand Pavilion, followed by a further fire in 1964 which completely destroyed it. It was replaced with a theatre. In 1963 the Regal Theatre, at the entrance, was converted into the Beachcomber Amusement Arcade.

Modern day pier

The pier head theatre was demolished and replaced by the Crazy Mouse roller coaster in 1998.

On 10 April 2011, seventy people were trapped by the tide near the pier.

See also
Blackpool's North Pier
Blackpool's Central Pier
List of piers in the United Kingdom

References

External links

1893 establishments in England
Amusement parks in England
Cultural infrastructure completed in 1893
Pier fires
Piers in Blackpool
Tourist attractions in Blackpool